Dave Ashleigh (born August 8, 1943) is an American water polo player. He competed at the 1964 Summer Olympics and the 1968 Summer Olympics. In 1983, he was inducted into the USA Water Polo Hall of Fame.

References

External links
 

1943 births
Living people
American male water polo players
Olympic water polo players of the United States
Water polo players at the 1964 Summer Olympics
Water polo players at the 1968 Summer Olympics
Sportspeople from Pomona, California
American water polo coaches
20th-century American people